Did It Again may refer to:

 "Did It Again" (Kylie Minogue song), 1997
 "Did It Again" (Shakira song), 2009
 "Did It Again" (Lil Tecca song), 2019

See also 
 Do It Again (disambiguation)